KDLO-FM (96.9 MHz) is a radio station broadcasting a classic country format serving Watertown, South Dakota, United States. The station is owned by Alpha Media, through licensee Digity 3E License, LLC. The 100,000 watt,  tower is located in Garden City, South Dakota.

History
KDLO-FM went on the air in 1968 and was the sister station to KDLO-TV, which was licensed to nearby Florence. Midcontinent Broadcasting owned both stations until 1994, when KDLO-FM was sold to the Sorenson Broadcasting Corporation. Sorenson was later bought by Digity, which in turn sold all its stations to Alpha Media.

Programming
John Seiber, formerly of KBWS-FM in Sisseton, South Dakota, is the morning announcer for this station.

References

External links
KDLO Website
Watertown Radio

DLO-FM
Country radio stations in the United States
Radio stations established in 1968
1968 establishments in South Dakota
Alpha Media radio stations